Sir David Alexander Warren, KCMG (born 11 August 1952) is a British diplomat, serving as HM Ambassador to Japan in the period 2008–2012. He retired from the Foreign and Commonwealth Office in January 2013, and served as chairman of The Japan Society in London from 2013 to 2019.

Biography 
Educated at Homefield Preparatory School when on Grove Road in Sutton, Surrey, Epsom College and Exeter College, Oxford, Warren joined the Foreign and Commonwealth Office in 1975. He studied Japanese between 1976 and 1978 at the School of Oriental and African Studies, University of London, and at the British Embassy language school in Kamakura, Japan.

Warren dealt with EU/Japan trade and economic relations (and multilateral trade policy issues more generally) in the FCO's European Community Department from 1983 to 1986. From 1987 to 1990, he served as Head of the Political Section in the British High Commission in Nairobi, Kenya. He returned to London as the Deputy Head of the FCO's Far Eastern Department from 1990 to 1991. He was seconded to the Cabinet Office (Office of Science and Technology) for two years from 1991, as the Head of the International Division, dealing among other issues with UK/Japan science and technology co-operation (the recycling of waste from nuclear reactors by British Nuclear Fuels being a key issue in this relationship).

Following his second tour of duty in Tokyo, from 1998 to 2000 he was the Head of the FCO's Hong Kong Department. In 2000, he became one of the Directors and senior management team for the new Government trade promotion organisation, British Trade International, later UK Trade and Investment, where he spent the next four years in charge of different aspects of sector and market-oriented international trade development. In 2004, he was appointed Director, Human Resources, for the FCO, and a member of the FCO Board of Management.

Having already been invested Companion of the Order of St Michael and St George (CMG), Warren was advanced Knight Commander of the Order of St Michael and St George (KCMG) in the 2012 New Year Honours.

He was a member of the Council of the University of Kent between 2013 and 2021, and served as Chair of Council between 2014 and 2020.    In June 2021, he was appointed Chair of the Nursing and Midwifery Council.    He is a non-executive director of Aberdeen Japan Investment Trust.

Honours
 Grand Cordon of the Order of the Rising Sun (2018)

Sources 
 Brit envoy, three Japanese staff hailed for disaster efforts, Japan Times, 1 January 2012.
 Britain appoints new ambassador, Japan Times, 4 March 2012
 Nuclear recycling program to continue amid looming storage crisis, Japan Times, 14 September 2012.
 Hollingworth, William (2012) More deregulation needed to attract investment: former British ambassador, Japan Times, 28 November 2012

References 

1952 births
Living people
Alumni of Exeter College, Oxford
Ambassadors of the United Kingdom to Japan
Knights Commander of the Order of St Michael and St George
People educated at Epsom College
20th-century British diplomats
21st-century British diplomats
Grand Cordons of the Order of the Rising Sun
Presidents of the Oxford Union